Sir William Palin Elderton KBE PhD (Oslo) (1877–1962) was a British actuary who served as president of the Institute of Actuaries (1932–1934). Elderton also had a very long association with the statistical journal Biometrika. In its early days he published several articles, and in 1935 he became chairman of the Biometrika Trust.

In 1900 when he was training to be an actuary Elderton met Karl Pearson and was drawn into the University College statistical group. In 1902 Elderton computed the first tables of Pearson's chi-squared and in 1907 he published an exposition of the Pearson curves for actuaries. His sister Ethel M. Elderton worked for Pearson, and together the Eldertons wrote an introduction to the new ideas in statistics. She  provided financial backing for Pearson's Anthropometric Laboratory, "his fourth laboratory".

Elderton was an invited speaker in the International Congress of Mathematicians 1908, Rome.

Books

 W. Palin Elderton (1906) Frequency-Curves and Correlation. London: Charles and Edwin Layton, 172 pages.
 W. Palin Elderton and Ethel M. Elderton (1909) Primer of Statistics. London: A&C Black Ltd.
 W. Palin Elderton and Richard C. Fippard (1914)The Construction of Mortality and Sickness Tables : a Primer. London : A. & C. Black.

Papers
 
 William Palin Elderton (1949): A few statistics on the length of English words. In: Journal of the Royal Statistical Society, Series A (General), Vol. CXII, Part IV, p. 436-445.

Elderton's work
 Karl-Heinz Best (2009): Wortlängen im Englischen. In: Glottometrics 19, p. 1-10. (PDF ram-verlag.) Review of Elderton's model of word length distributions proposing alternative models.)
 Peter Grzybek (2006): History and Methodology of Word Length Studies. The State of the Art. In: Peter Grzybek (ed.): Contributions to the Science of Text and Language: Word length studies and related issues. Dordrecht: Springer, S. 15-90. . (Grzybek discusses Elderton's model of word length distributions p. 19-26.)

References

Obituaries
 William P. Elderton FIA; CBE; KBE. TFA, 28 (1962-1964) p. 193-195.
 William P. Elderton FIA; CBE; KBE. JIA, 88 (1962) p. 245-252.
 
 Best, Karl-Heinz (2009): William Palin Elderton (1877-1962). In: Glottometrics'' 19, p. 99-101. (PDF ram-verlag.) (In German)
 F. A. A. Menzler Sir William Palin Elderton, 1877–1962, Journal of the Royal Statistical Society. Series A (General), Vol. 125, No. 4 (1962), pp. 669–672

British actuaries
1877 births
1962 deaths
Quantitative linguistics
British statisticians